Ole Tom Nord (born 27 November 1940) is a Norwegian ski jumper. He was born in Konsmo. He competed at the Winter Olympics in 1960, where he placed 23rd. He became Norwegian champion in ski jumping in 1960.

References

External links

1940 births
Living people
People from Vest-Agder
Norwegian male ski jumpers
Olympic ski jumpers of Norway
Ski jumpers at the 1960 Winter Olympics
Sportspeople from Agder
20th-century Norwegian people